2015 Games, LLC (formerly 2015, Inc.), also known as 2015, is an American video game development company, best known for developing Medal of Honor: Allied Assault.

History 
2015, Inc. was founded by Tom Kudirka in 1997. He assembled a team of developers by researching people who were participating in the FPS mod community. After months of working online and mostly only communicating via ICQ instant messenger his team created a Quake mod as a playable demo to show off their talent. Kudirka sent the demo to Activision who was so impressed with their work they awarded 2015 a contract developing the expansion pack to their upcoming game entitled SiN, developed by Ritual Entertainment.

Kudirka moved all of his team members to Tulsa, Oklahoma to begin work on the expansion pack SiN: Wages of Sin. The seven developers who spent over six months online creating the demo met one another for the first time. Three of the seven developers lived in a house rented by Kudirka where the living-room made up the development studio. The team was Tom Kudirka, Ken Turner, Zied Reike, Carl Glave, Benson Russel, Paul Jury and Michael Boon, who Kudirka relocated from Tasmania Australia.

SiN: Wages of Sin

Wages of Sin was the official expansion pack for Ritual Entertainment's game SiN. The game was published by Activision and released for the Windows platform in February 1999.

Medal of Honor: Allied Assault

Following the release of the film Saving Private Ryan, Steven Spielberg wanted to produce a World War II-themed video game, which was established by the Medal of Honor series, initially produced by DreamWorks Interactive, a joint venture between DreamWorks and Microsoft. While the first two Medal of Honor games were successful, DreamWorks Interactive had also produced the lackluster Trespasser in 1998, which left Spielberg unsure about continuing a video game division. DreamWorks Interactive was sold to Electronic Arts in 2000.

Spielberg was still interested in the Medal of Honor series, and his staff initially approached id Software about the project. id was at capacity at that time, but the id executives pointed them to 2015 as a possible candidate. Spielberg's staff made contact with 2015 in May 2000 about their interest in the series. Development began on Medal of Honor: Allied Assault soon after. To assist in the development of such a high-profile title, Kudirka hired additional developers such as Nathan Silvers, Paul Messerly, Keith Bell, Mackey McCandlish, Chance Glasco, Jason West and Radomir Kucharski, who Kudirka relocated from Katowice, Poland.

The game was published by Electronic Arts and released for the Windows platform on 22 January 2002 in North America and on 15 February 2002 in Europe. The game was a critical and financial success with many considering Medal of Honor: Allied Assault to have pioneered the cinematic first person shooter genre. The game provided a substantial push for Electronic Arts' Medal of Honor series.

Following the release, a group of developers left 2015 to form Infinity Ward, a studio that would become known for the Call of Duty series based around the same concept.

Men of Valor

In 2002, 2015 began development on its own intellectual property, Men of Valor, a first person shooter simulating infantry combat during the Vietnam era. Men of Valor follows Dean Shepard and his squad of Marines from the 3rd Battalion of the 3rd Marine Division through 13 missions of the Vietnam War, including missions at the height of the Tet Offensive. In historically-based scenarios, the player assumes a variety of roles in which they man the door gun on a Huey helicopter, steer a riverboat along enemy-infested shores, battle their way through enemy tunnel complexes, and call down fire as a forward observer. Mission types include pilot rescues, recon patrols, POW rescue, and search-and-destroy ops.

Men of Valor was published by Vivendi Universal and released for Xbox on 19 October 2004 in North America and on 5 November 2004 in Europe. The game was released for Windows on 29 October 2004 in North America and 12 November 2004 in Europe.

On 14 April 2015, it was announced that Nordic Games had closed an asset purchase agreement with 2015 to acquire the Men of Valor IP.

Trainwreck Studios
In late 1999 Kudirka created a separate development division of 2015 called Trainwreck Studios, a subsidiary specializing in mid-price to budget games. Under that name, a few titles were created: Laser Arena in 2000, CIA Operative: Solo Missions in 2001, and then Time Ace in 2007 for the Nintendo DS.

Games developed

Cancelled games

References

External links 

Companies based in Tulsa, Oklahoma
Video game development companies
Video game companies of the United States
Video game companies established in 1997